Aggrey Deaisile Joshua Mwanri (born 17 July 1955) is a Tanzanian CCM politician and was member of parliament for Siha constituency since 2000. He is now serving as the regional commissioner and head of security council for Tabora region. He was the Deputy Minister of State in the Prime Minister's Office for Regional Administration and Local Government.

References

1955 births
Living people
Chama Cha Mapinduzi MPs
Tanzanian MPs 2000–2005
Tanzanian MPs 2005–2010
Tanzanian MPs 2010–2015
Deputy government ministers of Tanzania
Old Moshi Secondary School alumni
University of Dar es Salaam alumni
Academic staff of Kivukoni College